Kikuchi line may refer to:
Kikuchi lines (physics), bands seen on crystals in electron diffraction
Kikuchi Line (railway), a railway line in Kumamoto Prefecture connecting Kami-Kumamoto Station to Miyoshi Station